Bom Dia Brasil (Portuguese for "Good Morning Brazil") is a Brazilian breakfast television programme produced and broadcast by TV Globo. The show includes segments from studios around Brazil, moderated by the main presenters in the home studio. The show includes Brazilian political and economic news. Presenters have included Renato Machado, Leilane Neubarth, Chico Pinheiro, and Carlos Monforte.

History 
Bom Dia premiered on 3 January 1983 with presenter Carlos Monforte, broadcast to Brasília. Initially, Bom Dia only covered political and economic issues in Brasília and there was no time for other topics.

The format of the show remained largely unchanged until March 29, 1996. With the debut of Intercine, there was a change of schedule: Bom Dia started to be shown at 7:30 a.m. and Bom Dia Praça at 7:00 a.m.

On 21 January 2019, the programme started to be broadcast between 8:00 and 9:00 a.m., 30 minutes longer than the previous 8:00 to 8:30 a.m. schedule.

On 5 August 2019, Bom Dia started using a new format as well as new scenery, music, and graphics.

Main presenters
 Chico Pinheiro (2011–2022)
 Ana Paula Araújo (since 2013)

Relief presenters
 Ana Luiza Guimarães (since 2006)
 Mariana Gross (since 2018)
 Helter Duarte (since 2020)

References

External links
 
 
 
 

Brazilian television news shows
Rede Globo original programming
1983 in Brazilian television
1983 Brazilian television series debuts
1980s Brazilian television series
1990s Brazilian television series
2000s Brazilian television series
2010s Brazilian television series
2020s Brazilian television series
Portuguese-language television shows
Breakfast television
Television series produced in Rio de Janeiro